Sedlec is a municipality and village in České Budějovice District in the South Bohemian Region of the Czech Republic. It has about 500 inhabitants. Centres of villages of Malé Chrášťany and Plástovice, which are parts of Sedlec, are uniquely preserved sets of folk baroque buildings and are protected by law as two village monument reservations.

Administrative parts

Villages of Lékařova Lhota, Malé Chrášťany, Plástovice and Vlhlavy are administrative parts of Sedlec.

Geography
It is located in the České Budějovice Basin.

History
The first written mention of Sedlec is from 1394.

Notable people
Jan Veselý (1923–2003), cyclist

References

External links

Villages in České Budějovice District